Hidden in This Picture is a one-act play by Emmy Award-winning playwright Aaron Sorkin. The play consists of a single scene with four male characters.

Plot
The plot concerns Robert and Jeff, two old friends who are taking their theater partnership (Jeff writes the plays,  Robert directs them) to the big screen in their first film. They've saved filming the final and most important scene of their movie for last; a complicated outdoor sequence involving hundreds of extras portraying disillusioned marines jogging at sunset. All is going seemingly well, until suddenly yet slowly, three cows walk directly into the shot. In response to this, some colorful language is exchanged. 

After some deep contemplation of whether or not one could feasibly find cows on a marine compound, let alone in Guam at all, Robert has somewhat of a mental breakdown as the sun continues to set "seemingly faster than it's ever set before". This causes Robert and Jeff to question their work, their relationship, the artistic health of contemporary film-making, and the ethics of shooting cows with firearms.	The other two roles are a hard-nosed manager (Reuben) and a geeky production assistant (Craig).

References

1988 plays
One-act plays
Plays by Aaron Sorkin